Clarence M. Kimball High School was a secondary educational facility located in Royal Oak, Michigan in Greater Detroit and had 1,217 students at the time of its consolidation with Dondero High School following the 05/06 school year. It is now Royal Oak High School. The final principal was Michael Greening. It was a part of Royal Oak Neighborhood Schools. The school's mascot was the Knights.

Notable alumni 
 Mona Hanna-Attisha, Flint Water Crisis whistleblower
Brad Havens, Major League Baseball (MLB) pitcher
Amy Ronanye Krause, Michigan Court of Appeals judge

High schools in Oakland County, Michigan